Gobs and Gals is a 1952 American comedy film directed by R. G. Springsteen and written by Arthur T. Horman. The film stars George Bernard, Bert Bernard, Robert Hutton, Cathy Downs, Gordon Jones and Florence Marly. The film was released on May 1, 1952 by Republic Pictures.

Plot

Cast    
George Bernard as Sparks Johnson / Mabel Mansfield
Bert Bernard as Salty Conners / Myrtle Mansfield
Robert Hutton as Lt. Steven F. Smith
Cathy Downs as Betty Lou Prentice 
Gordon Jones as CPO Mike Donovan
Florence Marly as Soyna DuBois
Leon Belasco as Peter
Emory Parnell as Senator Prentice
Leonid Kinskey as Ivan
Tommy Rettig as Bertram
Minerva Urecal as Mrs. Pursell
Olin Howland as Conductor 
Donald MacBride as Cmdr. J.E. Gerrens
Henry Kulky as Boris
Marie Blake as Bertram's Mother

References

External links 
 

1952 films
American comedy films
1952 comedy films
Republic Pictures films
Films directed by R. G. Springsteen
Military humor in film
American black-and-white films
1950s English-language films
1950s American films